Paris Jazz Warren (born September 6, 1982) is a former American football wide receiver. He was drafted by the Tampa Bay Buccaneers in the seventh round of the 2005 NFL Draft. He played college football at Utah.

Warren has also been a member of the Dallas Cowboys, New Orleans Saints, Florida Tuskers.

College career

Oregon
Warren played his freshman season at the University of Oregon in 2001, catching no passes but recording six special teams tackles.

Sac City
Warren played for Sacramento City College for one season before transferring to University of Utah.

Utah
Warren attended the University of Utah and was a two-year starter under head coach Urban Meyer after playing at Grant Union High School. In his senior year, Warren played a key part in the Utah Utes offense, as they went 12-0 and became the first BCS non-AQ conference team to play in a Bowl Championship Series bowl game. Utah defeated the Big East Conference champion Pittsburgh Panthers 35-7 to become the 2005 Fiesta Bowl champions. Against Pittsburgh, Warren was part of a rare trick play called the hook-and-ladder, or hook and lateral, in which quarterback Alex Smith threw a short pass to wide out Steve Savoy who then lateraled the ball to Warren. Warren proceeded to carry the ball into the endzone from just inside the Panthers 20-yard line. Warren finished the game with a Fiesta Bowl-record 15 receptions and 198 yards.  Warren's 80 catches in a season in 2004-05 remains the Utah single season record.

Statistics

Professional career

First stint with Buccaneers
Warren was drafted in the seventh round of the 2005 NFL Draft by the Tampa Bay Buccaneers. After spending the first five weeks of the season on the 53-man roster, he was waived and spent the rest of the 2005 season on the Buccaneers' practice squad. He made the team in 2006, playing in eight games and recording five catches for 63 yards.

Warren broke his leg catching a touchdown with three minutes left in the final game of the 2007 preseason. The injury forced him to spend the 2007 season on injured reserve.

Warren was released by the Buccaneers on August 26, 2008. He was re-signed to the team's practice squad on October 22, but released again on October 29.

Dallas Cowboys
Warren was signed to the practice squad of the Dallas Cowboys on December 10, 2008 and remained there through the 2008 season.

Second stint with Buccaneers
Warren re-signed a future contract with the Buccaneers in January 2009. He was waived on May 4.

New Orleans Saints
Warren signed with the New Orleans Saints on May 22, 2009. He was waived on August 27.

Florida Tuskers
Warren was signed by the Florida Tuskers in 2009. He was released on November 15, 2009.

References

External links
Tampa Bay Buccaneers bio
Utah Utes bio 
United Football League bio 

1982 births
Living people
Players of American football from Sacramento, California
American football wide receivers
Oregon Ducks football players
Utah Utes football players
Tampa Bay Buccaneers players
Dallas Cowboys players
New Orleans Saints players
Florida Tuskers players